HD 180902 b is an extrasolar planet orbiting the K-type star HD 180902 approximately 342 light years away in the constellation  Sagittarius.

Discovery 
HD 180902 b, along with other planets, was discovered in 2010 by scientists at the Keck Observatory. These planets were discovered via doppler spectroscopy, which is detecting exoplanets using the star's wobble.

Properties 
Orbit

HD 180902 b takes 510 days to orbit its parent star, which is longer than Earth's orbital period, which is 365 days. It orbits at a distance similar to Earth from the sun. HD 180902 orbits with mild eccentricity.

Characteristics 
HD 180902 b has a minimum mass of 1.685 times the mass of Jupiter, but since its inclination is not known, the true mass of the planet cannot be detected. According to a theoretical search by the observatory, it may have a radius that is 22.1% larger than Jupiter.

See also
 HD 4313 b
 HD 181342 b
 HD 206610 b
 HD 136418 b
 HD 212771 b

References

External links
 

Exoplanets discovered in 2010
Exoplanets detected by radial velocity
Sagittarius (constellation)
Giant planets